The 2004 Singapore Open (officially known as the Aviva Open Singapore 2004 for sponsorship reasons) was a five-star badminton tournament that took place at the Singapore Indoor Stadium in Singapore, from November 15 to November 21, 2004. The total prize money on offer was US$170,000.

Venue
 Singapore Indoor Stadium

Prize money distributions
Below is the prize money distributions for each round (all in USD$). In doubles it is referred as the prize money per pair:

Results

Men's singles

Women's singles

Men's doubles

Women's doubles

Mixed doubles

References

Singapore Open (badminton)
Singapore
2004 in Singaporean sport